The 2006 end of year tests, also known as the 2006 Autumn Internationals, refers to several international rugby union matches that took place during November 2006 principally between touring teams from the southern hemisphere – Australia, Argentina, New Zealand, the Pacific Islands and South Africa – and one or more teams from the Six Nations Championship: England, France, Ireland, Italy, Scotland and Wales. Canada and Romania also played Six Nations teams during this period.

Ireland's games were the last Tests to be played at Lansdowne Road before it was closed for redevelopment.

Tours

Week 1

The attendance for this game was a stadium record.

Week 2

This was Argentina's first, and to date only, victory against a reigning Rugby World Cup holder.

South Africa played in kits similar to those worn by the 1906 touring squad, which was captained by Paul Roos.

Week 3

The Italian squad included seven players born in Argentina: Pablo Canavosio, Gonzalo Canale, Ramiro Pez, Sergio Parisse, Santiago Dellapè, Martin Castrogiovanni and Carlos Nieto. Of them, six were in the starting line-up; only Carlos Nieto was on the bench.

Week 4

See also
 End of year rugby union tests

References

External links
2006 Wallabies Fixtures at Rugby.com.au
2006 All Blacks fixtures at AllBlacks.com
2006 Springboks fixtures at SARugby.co.za
2006 Pacific Islanders fixtures at PacificIslanders.co.nz
2006/07 Ireland fixtures at irishrugby.ie

2006
2006–07 in European rugby union
2006 in Oceanian rugby union
2006 in North American rugby union
2006 in South American rugby union
2006 in South African rugby union